Queen Lurline is a fictional character in the Oz books by L. Frank Baum  and other authors.

The name "Lurline" is a variant of Loreley, the Rhine nymph; the name has been used for ships, and has other associations.

Lurline in L. Frank Baum's books

Descriptions in the Oz books
In the Oz mythos, Lurline is first mentioned in The Tin Woodman of Oz.  She is the ethereal Queen of the Fairies and their creator. She is credited with enchanting the Land of Oz centuries ago so that it became a fairy country. Prior to this, Oz was just an ordinary country shut off from the rest of the world by four impassable deserts. After enchanting the country, Lurline left Princess Ozma to rule the country together with King Pastoria.

Lurline is therefore a fundamental ingredient in the backstory or foundation myth of Oz; and as such she recurs in various subsequent Oz books — as in Edward Einhorn's Paradox in Oz — and is at least mentioned in others — from Baum's Glinda of Oz to Dave Hardenbrook's The Unknown Witches of Oz.

Possible references in other series
In Baum's book, The Life and Adventures of Santa Claus, the Queen of the Fairies is unnamed, and the Queen of the Wood Nymphs is named Zurline. Some debate exists among fans of the Oz books as to whether the unnamed Fairy Queen and Lurline are the same person.  Queen Zixi of Ix depicts another Fairy Queen named Lulea, who is based in the Forest of Burzee, just as The Fairy Queen and Queen Zurline of the Wood Nymphs are.

Lurline in Gregory Maguire's books
Lurline also appears in Wicked, Gregory Maguire's 1995 revisionist novel set in Oz; she is sometimes called "Lurlina". Maguire's version of Lurline is depicted as the central figure in a pagan religion in Oz. Although faith in the fairy queen Lurline is described as out of fashion, Oz celebrates a winter holiday dedicated to her, known as Lurlinemas. Lurline's followers are sometimes persecuted by believers in one of Oz's other major religion, Unionism, which worships "The Unnamed God."

References

Oz (franchise) characters
Fictional fairies and sprites
Fictional queens
Fairy Queens
Literary characters introduced in 1918
Oz (franchise) characters who use magic
Female characters in literature